is a Japanese footballer who plays as a midfielder for FC Tokyo.

Career statistics

References

External links

2002 births
Living people
Japanese footballers
Japan youth international footballers
Association football midfielders
FC Tokyo players
FC Tokyo U-23 players
J1 League players
J3 League players